Garkuiyeh (also Romanized as Garkū’īyeh; also known as Gar Gooh) is a village in Ganjabad Rural District, Esmaili District, Anbarabad County, Kerman Province, Iran. At the 2006 census, its population was 276, in 61 families.

References 

Populated places in Anbarabad County